The Primetime Emmy Award for Outstanding Guest Actor in a Drama Series is an award presented annually by the Academy of Television Arts & Sciences (ATAS). It is given in honor of an actor who has delivered an outstanding performance in a guest starring role on a television drama series for the primetime network season.

The award was first presented at the 27th Primetime Emmy Awards on May 19, 1975, to Patrick McGoohan for his performance on Columbo: By Dawn's Early Light. It has undergone several name changes, originally honoring leading and supporting actors in single appearances on drama and comedy series through 1978. The award was reintroduced at the 38th Primetime Emmy Awards under the name Outstanding Guest Performer in a Drama Series, honoring actors and actresses in guest starring roles on television drama series. In 1989, the category was split into categories for each gender, resulting in the name change to its current title.

Since its inception, the award has been given to 36 actors. Charles S. Dutton, John Lithgow, Ron Cephas Jones and Patrick McGoohan have won the most awards in this category with two each. Michael J. Fox has been nominated for the award on seven occasions, the most within the category.

Winners and nominees
Listed below are the winners of the award for each year, as well as the other nominees.

1970s

1980s

1990s

2000s

2010s

2020s

Performers with multiple wins
2 wins
 Charles S. Dutton (consecutive)
 Ron Cephas Jones
 John Lithgow
 Patrick McGoohan

Programs with multiple wins

6 wins
 The Practice (5 consecutive)

3 wins
 This Is Us (2 consecutive)

2 wins
 Scandal (consecutive)

Performers with multiple nominations

7 nominations
 Michael J. Fox

5 nominations
 Beau Bridges
 Robert Morse

4 nominations
 James Cromwell
 Charles Durning

3 nominations
 Dylan Baker
 Reg E. Cathey
 Charles S. Dutton
 Harold Gould
 Ron Cephas Jones

2 nominations
 F. Murray Abraham
 Alan Alda
 Hank Azaria
 Bill Bixby
 Don Cheadle
 Christian Clemenson
 Ted Danson
 Jeremy Davies
 Will Geer
 Louis Gossett Jr.
 John Glover
 Michael Jeter
 James Earl Jones
 Richard Kiley
 Martin Landau
 John Larroquette
 John Lithgow
 Tim Matheson
 Patrick McGoohan
 Gerald McRaney
 Oliver Platt
 Matthew Perry
 Robert Reed
 Glynn Turman
 James Whitmore
 Robin Williams

Programs with multiple nominations

14 nominations
 ER

11 nominations
 The Practice

10 nominations
 The Good Wife

8 nominations
 This Is Us

7 nominations
 Mad Men
 The West Wing

6 nominations
 St. Elsewhere

5 nominations
 Chicago Hope
 House of Cards
 Picket Fences
 Succession

3 nominations
 Boston Legal
 Homeland
 Homicide: Life on the Street
 L.A. Law
 The Mandalorian
 Midnight Caller
 thirtysomething
 Touched by an Angel
 Without a Trace

2 nominations
 Cagney & Lacey
 Columbo
 The Crown
 Damages
 Dexter
 Justified
 Masters of Sex
 Moonlighting
 Ray Donovan
 Rescue Me
 Scandal
 The Sopranos
 Studio 60 on the Sunset Strip
 Tales from the Crypt

See also
 TCA Award for Individual Achievement in Drama
 Critics' Choice Television Award for Best Guest Performer in a Drama Series
 Golden Globe Award for Best Supporting Actor – Series, Miniseries or Television Film
 Screen Actors Guild Award for Outstanding Performance by a Male Actor in a Drama Series

References

Guest Actor - Drama Series